The 1964 Cal State Los Angeles Diablos football team  was an American football team that represented California State College at Los Angeles—now known as California State University, Los Angeles—as a member of the California Collegiate Athletic Association (CCAA) during the 1964 NCAA College Division football season. Led by second-year head coach Homer Beatty, Cal State Los Angeles compiled an overall record of 9–0 with a mark of 5–0 in conference play, winning the CCAA title. The Diablos began the season ranked No. 13 in the UPI small college poll. After defeating No. 1 San Diego State on the road, they jumped to No. 5. They went on to compile a perfect 9–0 record (5–0 against CCAA members), winning the CCAA championship and outscoring opponents by a total of 368 to 64, an average score of 41–7. It was the first perfect season in school history. 

At the end of the season, the Diablos were selected by the UPI's board of coaches as the small college national champion. The team received 26 first-place votes to seven for No. 2 Wittenberg.  In the Associated Press small college poll, the  Diablos were ranked No. 3, behind Wittenberg and Prairie View.

Schedule

Key personnel
Coach Beatty led the Diablos to three consecutive CCAA championships and a 25–2 record from 1963 to 1965. He was selected as one of the inaugural inductees to the Cal State Los Angeles Hall of Fame when it was created in 1985.

The 1964 team was led by quarterback Dunn Marteen, an ex-Marine who was a junior college All-American at Santa Ana Junior College. Tackle Walter Johnson, a transfer from New Mexico State, starred on both offense and defense. Johnson was selected by the Cleveland Browns in the second round (27th overall pick) of the 1965 NFL Draft and played 13 seasons in the NFL.

The Diablos dominated the 1964 All-CCAA football team with nine players receiving first-team honors: Marteen; Johnson (the only player named to both the defensive and offensive units); fullback Art Robinson; halfback Ray Jones; offensive tackle Don Davis; defensive end Walt Thurmond; linebacker Bernie Christian; and defensive backs Jesse Willard and George Youngblood.

Players in the NFL
The following Cal State Los Angeles players were selected in the 1965 NFL Draft.

References

Cal State Los Angeles
Cal State Los Angeles Diablos football seasons
NCAA Small College Football Champions
California Collegiate Athletic Association football champion seasons
College football undefeated seasons
Cal State Los Angeles Diablos football